A National unity government or National Union Government is a broad coalition government consisting of all major parties in a legislature.

National Union Government may also refer to:

 National Union Government (Luxembourg), used to denote either of two different periods in the history of the Grand Duchy
 National Union Government (1916)
 National Union Government (1945)

See also
 National Union of Government Employees (NUGE), a former trade union in Trinidad and Tobago
 National Union of Government and Federated Workers, a trade union in Trinidad and Tobago